"When the Curtain Falls" is a song by American rock band Greta Van Fleet. It is their first single off of their debut album, Anthem of the Peaceful Army. In November 2018, it reached number one on the Billboard Mainstream Rock chart.

Background
The song was first released on July 17, 2018, as the debut single off of their at the time unreleased and untitled upcoming studio album. The single was released ahead of the studio album to kick off their summer 2018 tour. The song's live debut on national television was on July 28, 2018, on The Tonight Show Starring Jimmy Fallon. A music video was released on August 15, 2018. The video alternates between clips of the band performing in the desert, and footage of glowing-eyed people observing things resembling solar eclipses and Aurora borealis.

The song was featured in the soundtracks of the video games NHL 19 and MLB The Show 19. It was also released as DLC for Rock Band 4.

Composition and themes
Billboard described the song's sound as "hard-hitting drums, funky, distorted guitar solos and sky-high, impassioned vocals. Rolling Stone described the song as "swaggering" and "blistering" with a bluesy guitar and bass melody. Variety noted that the song, like much of the band's music, had a sound similar to Led Zeppelin. Lyrically, the song discusses a person's fall from grace, vocalist Josh Kizska singing "When the curtain falls/ Walk the hollow halls, babe/ Once a valley doll/ Now, you’re not at all."

Reception
MetalSucks praised the song, comparing it favorably to the work of Led Zeppelin, concluding that "...it's pretty good! If you like Led Zep it's hard to imagine you won't like this, so crank it and enjoy. If you were never into Robert Plant's voice... well, you should probably just move along." Loudwire similarly praised it for its "rich classic rock warmth and sheen worthy of the genre's most accomplished artists". Multiple publications and news outlets praised the band's live performance of the song on The Tonight Show Starring Jimmy Fallon as well, noting that they also received a standing ovation from the crowd.

Personnel
Joshua Kiszka – vocals
Jacob Kiszka – guitar
Samuel Kiszka – bass 
Daniel Wagner – drums

Charts

Weekly charts

Year-end charts

References

Greta Van Fleet songs
2018 songs
2018 singles
Republic Records singles